Žihobce is a municipality and village in Klatovy District in the Plzeň Region of the Czech Republic. It has about 600 inhabitants.

Administrative parts
Villages of Bešetín, Bílenice, Kadešice, Rozsedly and Šimanov are administrative parts of Žihobce.

History
The first written mention of Žihobce is from 1045.

Gallery

References

Villages in Klatovy District